is a Japanese manga series written and illustrated by Minoru Takeyoshi. It was serialized in Shogakukan's seinen manga magazine Monthly Big Comic Spirits from December 2014 to October 2017, with its chapters collected in six tankōbon volumes.

Publication
Hengoku no Schwester, written and illustrated by Minoru Takeyoshi, was serialized in Shogakukan's seinen manga magazine Monthly Big Comic Spirits from December 27, 2014, to October 27, 2017. Shogakukan collected its chapters in six tankōbon volumes, released from June 12, 2015, to December 12, 2017.

The manga is licensed in France by Glénat.

Volume list

See also
Battleground Workers—another manga series by the same author.

Notes

References

External links
 

Historical anime and manga
Seinen manga
Shogakukan manga